Thabeikkyin is a town in the Mandalay Region of central Myanmar. It is alleged by the Democratic Voice of Burma that a secret nuclear facility is located there.

See also
Thabeikkyin District

References

External links
Satellite map at Maplandia.com

Populated places in Pyin Oo Lwin District
Township capitals of Myanmar